The 2013 Setanta Sports Cup Final was the final match of the 2013 Setanta Sports Cup, an all-Ireland association football competition. The match took place on 11 May 2013 in Tallaght Stadium, home of one of the participating teams, Shamrock Rovers. Drogheda United were the other side to contest the final. Shamrock Rovers won the match 7–1 to win their first trophy under manager Trevor Croly.

References

2013
Setanta Sports Cup Final 2013
Setanta Sports Cup Final 2013
Final